Älvsby IF is a Swedish football club located in Älvsbyn.

Background
Älvsby IF currently plays in Division 4 Norrbotten Södra which is the sixth tier of Swedish football. They play their home matches at the Älvåkra IP in Älvsbyn.

The club is affiliated to Norrbottens Fotbollförbund.

Season to season

Footnotes

External links
 Älvsby IF – Official website

Sport in Norrbotten County
Football clubs in Norrbotten County